Rezart Maho (born 8 February 1984) is an Albanian retired football player and current manager of FK Vora.

Career

Dinamo
Rezert started his career with Dinamo Tirana during the 2001–2002 season and, in that time, didn't receive many opportunities to play in the league.

He played in the final of the Albanian Cup in the 2002–2003 season with Dinamo Tirana against Teuta Durrës when he was substituted with January Ziambo in the last five minutes of the match. The match was played on 31 May 2003 and ended with a 1–0 win for Dinamo. Before that he had scored two goals in a 3–0 win for Dinamo against Luftëtari in the first match of the second round of the Albanian Cup.

Afterward, he played with Apolonia Fier, Pogradeci, Egnatia and Kastrioti before returning again to Dinamo Tirana at the start of 2007–2008 season.

Kalamata FC
After he couldn't established himself as a regular starter at Dinamo Tirana Maho left the team after the first half of the season ended to join Kalamata FC of Beta Ethniki (second division) in Greece. He had some good performances with Kalamata FC playing regularly in the starting eleven (17 matches, 5 goals).

With the start of the 2008–2009 season a new coach took over at Kalamata FC and the Albanian midfielder lost his position in the squad. After playing only 3 games as a substitute he returned in Albania and joined Partizani Tiranë.

Partizani
Maho joined Partizani Tiranë on 28 January 2009. Just four days later he played his first match with "The Red Bulls" against KS Bylis Ballsh coming on during the game as a substitute. The match ended with a 1–0 win for Partizani Tiranë

Recently he has become a first team player at Partizani Tiranë and is considered as one of the most important players of the current squad.

References

External links
 Profile - FSHF
Rezeart Maho profile at Partizani.Net

1984 births
Living people
Footballers from Tirana
Albanian footballers
Association football midfielders
FK Dinamo Tirana players
KF Apolonia Fier players
KS Egnatia Rrogozhinë players
KS Pogradeci players
KS Kastrioti players
Kalamata F.C. players
FK Partizani Tirana players
KF Laçi players
Besëlidhja Lezhë players
FC Kamza players
KF Adriatiku Mamurrasi players
Kategoria Superiore players
Kategoria e Parë players
Kategoria e Dytë players
Albanian expatriate footballers
Expatriate footballers in Greece
Albanian expatriate sportspeople in Greece
Albanian football managers